The 1997 NFL season was the 78th regular season of the National Football League (NFL). The Oilers relocated from Houston, Texas to Nashville, Tennessee. The newly renamed Tennessee Oilers played their home games during this season at the Liberty Bowl Memorial Stadium in Memphis, Tennessee while construction of a new stadium in Nashville started. Houston would rejoin the NFL with the expansion Texans in 2002.

Due to Game 7 of the 1997 World Series, the Chicago Bears–Miami Dolphins game at Pro Player Stadium was delayed one day to Monday, October 27.

The season ended with Super Bowl XXXII when the Denver Broncos defeated the Green Bay Packers 31–24 at Qualcomm Stadium. This broke the National Football Conference (NFC)'s streak of thirteen consecutive Super Bowl victories, the last American Football Conference (AFC) win having been the Los Angeles Raiders defeating the Washington Redskins in Super Bowl XVIII.

Player movement

Transactions

Retirements
February 1, 1997: Four-time Super Bowl starting quarterback Jim Kelly announces his retirement from the Buffalo Bills. .

Draft
The 1997 NFL Draft was held from April 19 to 20, 1997 at New York City's Theater at Madison Square Garden. With the first pick, the St. Louis Rams selected offensive tackle Orlando Pace from Ohio State University.

Referee changes
Red Cashion and Howard Roe retired. Bill Carollo and Phil Luckett were promoted to referee.

Major rule changes
When a team fakes a punt and throws the ball downfield, pass interference will not be called on the two outside defenders who are actually trying to block a coverage man from getting downfield and might not even know the ball has been thrown.
In order to reduce taunting and excessive celebrations, no player may remove his helmet while on the playing field except during timeouts, between quarters, and in the case of an injury. Violating the rule results in a 15-yard penalty. This is known as the "Emmitt Smith rule" after the Dallas Cowboys' running back's habit of taking his helmet off every time he scored a touchdown.

Preseason

American Bowl
A series of National Football League pre-season exhibition games that were held at sites outside the United States. Three were contested in 1997, including the defending Super Bowl XXXI champion Green Bay Packers competing in Toronto.

Hall of Fame Game
The Pro Football Hall of Fame Game, in which the Minnesota Vikings defeated the Seattle Seahawks 28–26, was played on July 26, and held at Tom Benson Hall of Fame Stadium in Canton, Ohio, the same city where the league was founded. The 1997 Hall of Fame Class included Mike Haynes, Wellington Mara, Don Shula and Mike Webster.

Regular season

Scheduling formula

Highlights of the 1997 season included:
Thanksgiving: Two games were played on Thursday, November 27, featuring the Chicago Bears at the Detroit Lions and the Tennessee Oilers at the Dallas Cowboys, with the Lions and Oilers winning.

Final standings

Tiebreakers
Miami finished ahead of NY Jets in the AFC East based on head-to-head sweep (2–0).
Pittsburgh finished ahead of Jacksonville in the AFC Central based on better net division points (78 to Jaguars’ 23).
Oakland finished ahead of San Diego in the AFC West based on better division record (2–6 to Chargers’ 1–7).
San Francisco was the top NFC playoff seed based on better conference record than Green Bay (11–1 to Packers’ 10–2).
Detroit finished ahead of Minnesota in the NFC Central based on head-to-head sweep (2–0).
Carolina finished ahead of Atlanta in the NFC West based on head-to-head sweep (2–0).

Playoffs

Statistical leaders

Team

Individual

Awards

Players of the Month

AFC

NFC

Coaching changes

St. Louis Rams – Dick Vermeil; replaced Rich Brooks who was fired after the 1996 season.
New Orleans Saints – Mike Ditka; replaced interim head coach Rick Venturi who replaced the resigning Jim Mora that same year.
New York Giants – Jim Fassel; replaced Dan Reeves who was fired after the 1996 season.
Atlanta Falcons – Dan Reeves; replaced June Jones who was fired after the 1996 season.
New York Jets – Bill Parcells; replaced Rich Kotite who was fired after the 1996 season.
Detroit Lions – Bobby Ross; replaced Wayne Fontes who was fired after the 1996 season.
San Francisco 49ers – Steve Mariucci; replaced George Seifert who resigned after the 1996 season.
New England Patriots – Pete Carroll; replaced Bill Parcells who accepted the job to coach the Jets.
Oakland Raiders – Joe Bugel; replaced Mike White who was fired after the 1996 season.
San Diego Chargers – Kevin Gilbride; replaced Bobby Ross who resigned after the 1996 season.

Stadium changes
 Jacksonville Jaguars: Jacksonville Municipal Stadium was renamed Alltel Stadium after the communications company Alltel acquired the naming rights
 San Diego Chargers: Jack Murphy Stadium was renamed Qualcomm Stadium after the tech company Qualcomm acquired the naming rights
 Tennessee Oilers: The relocated Oilers moved from Houston's Astrodome to the Liberty Bowl Memorial Stadium in Memphis
 Washington Redskins: The Redskins moved from RFK Stadium to Jack Kent Cooke Stadium in the Maryland suburbs, named in memory of team owner Jack Kent Cooke

New uniforms

 The Atlanta Falcons added new striping on pants, and switched from black to red numbers on the white jerseys.
 The Baltimore Ravens switched to a new numbers style with shadows in the back. White pants were worn with their purple jerseys instead of black pants.
 The Cincinnati Bengals started to use a brighter shade of orange on their uniforms. A secondary logo featuring a leaping tiger was added to the jersey sleeves, and another secondary logo with Bengal's head was also introduced.
 The Denver Broncos introduced new uniforms, changing their primary color from orange to navy blue, and their royal blue helmets to navy blue. The design featured a streak running down the sides of both the jerseys and the pants: orange on the blue jerseys and blue on the white jerseys. The "D" logo with the horse coming out of it was retired in favor of a horse head with blue outlines and an orange mane.
 The Green Bay Packers reduced the number of stripes on the arm sleeves from five to three.
 The Jacksonville Jaguars switched from block numbers to a new style font, and added black side panels to the jerseys.
 Miami Dolphins introduced new uniforms featuring a darker shade of aqua and new shadows in the numbers. The dolphin in the helmet logo was also darkened and resigned to give it a more serious expression.
 The New York Jets discontinued wearing green pants with their white jerseys, and wore white pants for all games regardless of their jersey.
 The Pittsburgh Steelers switched from block to rounded numbers on the jerseys, matching the number font on the back of their helmets. A Steelers logo patch was also added to the left side of all jerseys, as an alternative to "fixing" the traditional "missing" logo on the helmet's right side. To celebrate the team's 75th anniversary season, the Steelers introduced 1960s-era throwback uniforms with black jerseys, gold numbers and helmets, and white pants.
 The Philadelphia Eagles added the eagles head logo to the white jersey sleeves (they only did it to the green jerseys in 1996)
 The San Diego Chargers wore white pants instead of navy blue with their white jerseys.
 The San Francisco 49ers removed the gold trim on nameplates to just plain black.
 The Tampa Bay Buccaneers introduced new uniforms, changing their primary color from orange to red, and their white helmets and pants to pewter. Black and orange became trim colors. They also replaced the "Bucco Bruce" helmet logo with a red wind-swept flag featuring a white pirate skull and crossed sabres similar to a Jolly Roger.
 The relocated Tennessee Oilers began wearing an alternative logo on the left side of all jerseys that combined their oil rig derrick logo with elements from the flag of Tennessee.

Television
This was the fourth and final year under the league's four-year broadcast contracts with ABC, Fox, NBC, TNT, and ESPN. ABC, Fox, and NBC continued to televise Monday Night Football, the NFC package, the AFC package, respectively. Sunday night games aired on TNT during the first half of the season, and ESPN during the second half of the season. This was the last season to date that TNT broadcast NFL games, as well as the last for NBC until 2006. When the new TV contracts were signed near the end of the season, Fox retained the NFC package, CBS took over the AFC package, and ESPN won the right to televise all of the Sunday night games.

With Mike Ditka becoming the new head coach of the New Orleans Saints, Sam Wyche was named to replace him on The NFL on NBC pregame show. NBC fired Marv Albert following Week 3 due to sexual assault charges against him; Tom Hammond replaced Albert as the network's #2 play-by-play announcer.

For TNT's final season, Mark May joined Verne Lundquist and Pat Haden in a three-man booth.

External links
Football Outsiders 1997 DVOA Ratings and Commentary

References

"The Official national Football League: 1998 Record and Fact Book." Workman Publishing Co. New York. July 1998.
NFL Record and Fact Book
NFL History 1991–2000 (Last accessed October 17, 2005)
Total Football: The Official Encyclopedia of the National Football League
Steelers Fever – History of NFL Rules (Last accessed October 17, 2005)

National Football League seasons
 
National Football League